The 1986 NAIA women's basketball tournament was the sixth annual tournament held by the NAIA to determine the national champion of women's college basketball among its members in the United States and Canada.

Francis Marion defeated Wayland Baptist in the championship game, 75–65, to claim the Patriots' first NAIA national title. 

The tournament was played in Kansas City, Missouri.

Qualification

The tournament field remained fixed at sixteen teams, with seeds assigned to the top eight teams.

The tournament utilized a simple single-elimination format, with an additional third-place game for the two teams that lost in the semifinals.

Bracket

See also
1986 NCAA Division I women's basketball tournament
1986 NCAA Division II women's basketball tournament
1986 NCAA Division III women's basketball tournament
1986 NAIA men's basketball tournament

References

NAIA
NAIA Women's Basketball Championships
Tournament
1986 in sports in Missouri